In April 1998 President of Sri Lanka Chandrika Kumaratunga awarded national honours to 78 individuals for distinguished services to mark the golden jubilee of Sri Lankan independence.

Deshamanya
Fourteen individuals received the Deshamanya honour:
 Ranjit Abeysuriya (1932–2014), lawyer
 W. D. Amaradeva (1927–2016), musician
 Ken Balendra (born 1940), businessman
 Chitrasena (1921–2005), dancer
 Charitha Prasanna de Silva
 H. L. de Silva (1928–2009), lawyer
 R. K. W. Goonesekera (born 1928), academic
 Tamara Ilangaratne (born 1925), politician
 A. T. Kovoor (1898–1978), academic
 Vernon Mendis (1925–2010), diplomat
 Christopher Rajindra Panabokke
 Duncan White (1918–1998), athlete
 Doreen Winifred Wickramasinghe
 Elanga Wikramanayake, lawyer

Deshabandu
Seventeen individuals received the Deshabandu honour:
 P. T. de Silva (1929–2015), physician
 Adhikari Mudiyanselage Dharmasena
 Thambimuttu Duraisingam
 S. D. Gunadasa (1931–2014), businessman
 Muhammed Abdul Hameed Muhammed Hussain
 Nowfer Saly Jabir
 Kolamba Patabendige Tissaweera Siriwardana Jinasena
 M. G. Mendis (1911–2000), trade unionist
 Chasnyn Musafer
 Rajapakse Pathirannehelage Jayaratne Pathirana
 Minuwanpitiyage Darmasiri Dayananda Pieris
 M. J. Perera (1915–2002), broadcaster
 Seekkubaduge Wilbert Silva
 Ananda Daivin Soysa
 Rajadurai Sellaiah Thanabalasundaram
 Balaupasakage Yasodis Thudawe
 Puvaneshwari Vaithianathan

Veera Chudamani
One individual received the Veera Chudamani honour:
 Manorani Sarawanamuttu

Vidya Jyothi
Nine individuals received the Vidya Jyothi honour:
 Arjuna Aluwihare
 Senaka Dias Bandaranayake
 M. A. Careem
 C. B. Dissanayake
 D. P. Anura Fernando
 J. B. Peiris, physician
 V. K. Samaranayake (1939–2007), academic
 Diyanath Samarasinghe
 R. O. Barnes Wijesekera

Kala Keerthi
Five individuals received the Kala Keerthi honour:
 Dharmasiri Jayakody
 Nalini Jayasuriya
 Premasiri Khemadasa (1937–2008), composer
 Iranganie Serasinghe (born 1927), actress
 Regi Siriwardena (1922–2004), academic

Vidya Nidhi
Three individuals received the Vidya Nidhi honour:
 Norman Rienzie de Silva
 S. K. Sayakkara
 Prematilake Wijesekera

Kala Suri
Nine individuals received the Kala Suri honour:
 Tissa Abeysekara (1939–2009), filmmaker
 Dharmasiri Bandaranayake (born 1949), film director
 D. V. Richard de Silva
 Parakrama Kodituwakku, poet
 Jayalath Manoratne (born 1948), dramatist
 J. S. B. Jaya Rani Perera
 S. A D. D. Samarasekera
 A. Sivanesa Selvan
 Jiffry Yoonoos

Sri Lanka Thilaka
Sixteen individuals received the Sri Lanka Thilaka honour:
 Karunapala Aprakke
 K. Arnis
 G. Liyanage David
 U. M. Haniffa
 H. K. Hettiarachchi
 K. S. Jayasena
 W. Jayathilaka
 M. R. T. Karunaratne
 Edmund Opanayake
 S. V. P. Tikiri Panikkiya
 Kuragala Pinsara
 D. C. M. Piyatilake
 Sunil Premadasa
 G. S. B. Senanayake
 T. A. Sirisena
 Piyadasa Wickramanayake

Veera Prathapa
Three individuals received the Veera Prathapa honour:
 O. R. A. K. Perera
 Amithapala Weerasinghe
 R. P. R. Wickramapala

Sri Lanka Rathna
One individual received the Sri Lanka Rathna honour:
 Susumu Saegi

References
 
 

Sri Lanka National Honours
National Honours
Civil awards and decorations of Sri Lanka